The West Indies men's cricket team toured Zimbabwe in February 2023 to play two Test matches. In December 2022, the Zimbabwe Cricket (ZC) confirmed the fixtures. The first game of  the series was Zimbabwe's first Test match after an 18-month gap since they played a home series against Bangladesh in July 2021 and the fourth time that the West Indies have toured Zimbabwe since 2000, with the most recent tour being in 2017; the tourists had won the three previous series without losing a Test match. West Indies won the series 1–0 after claiming an innings victory over Zimbabwe in the second Test.

Squads

Tour match
Before the start of the Test series, West Indies played a three-day warm-up fixture against a Zimbabwe XI side.

Test series

1st Test

2nd Test

Notes

References

External links
 Series home at ESPNcricinfo 

2023 in Zimbabwean cricket
2023 in West Indian cricket
International cricket competitions in 2022–23
2022-23